Chemsakia subarmata is a species of beetle in the family Cerambycidae. It was described by Linsley in 1967.

References

Trachyderini
Beetles described in 1967